Arthur Edwin Cock (17 March 1900 – 10 September 1966) was an Australian rules footballer who played for the St Kilda Football Club in the Victorian Football League (VFL).

Notes

External links 

1900 births
1966 deaths
Australian rules footballers from Melbourne
St Kilda Football Club players
South Bendigo Football Club players
People from Clifton Hill, Victoria